
Gmina Radzymin is an urban-rural gmina (administrative district) in Wołomin County, Masovian Voivodeship, in east-central Poland.

Villages
Apart from the town of Radzymin, Gmina Radzymin contains the villages and settlements of Arciechów, Borki, Cegielnia, Ciemne, Dybów-Folwark, Dybów-Górki, Dybów-Kolonia, Emilianów, Łąki, Łosie, Mokre, Nadma, Nowe Załubice, Nowy Janków, Opole, Popielarze, Ruda, Rżyska, Sieraków, Słupno, Stare Załubice, Stary Dybów, Stary Janków, Wiktorów, Zawady and Zwierzyniec.

Neighbouring gminas
Gmina Radzymin is bordered by the towns of Kobyłka and Marki, and by the gminas of Dąbrówka, Klembów, Nieporęt, Serock and Wołomin.

References

Polish official population figures 2006

Radzymin
Wołomin County